Gertrud Anita Ekström (13 January 1943 ⁠– 18 June 2022) was a Swedish actress. At the 7th Guldbagge Awards she won the award for Best Actress for her role in Jänken. She has appeared in more than 30 films and television shows since 1969.

Selected filmography
 Jänken (1970)
 A Handful of Love (1974)
 The Rider on the White Horse (1978)
 I Am Maria (1979)
 Children's Island (1980)
 Tuppen (1981)
 1939 (1989)
 Roseanna (1993)

References

External links

 

1943 births
2022 deaths
20th-century Swedish actresses
21st-century Swedish actresses
Swedish film actresses
Swedish television actresses
People from Solna Municipality
Best Actress Guldbagge Award winners